Schuitemania is a genus of terrestrial orchids spreading by means of underground rhizomes. Only one species is known, Schuitemania merrillii, endemic to the Philippines. Named after Kew orchid specialist and lead botanist for Asia, André Schuiteman.

References

Monotypic Orchidoideae genera
Cranichideae genera
Goodyerinae
Endemic orchids of the Philippines